Maliak Alieva (born 8 March 1995) is a Russian para table tennis player. She won the silver medal in the women's individual C6 event at the 2020 Summer Paralympics held in Tokyo, Japan.  She also won one of the bronze medals in the women's team 6–8 event.

References

Living people
1995 births
Russian female table tennis players
Paralympic table tennis players of Russia
Paralympic silver medalists for the Russian Paralympic Committee athletes
Paralympic bronze medalists for the Russian Paralympic Committee athletes
Paralympic medalists in table tennis
Table tennis players at the 2020 Summer Paralympics
Medalists at the 2020 Summer Paralympics
20th-century Russian women
21st-century Russian women